Juho Albert Pudas (originally Putaansuu) (February 17, 1899 – October 28, 1976) was a Finnish-born Canadian ice hockey player and coach. He was the first Finnish-born hockey player in the National Hockey League, and played 4 games for the Toronto St. Patricks during the 1926–27 season. Following his hockey career Pudas was active in the capacity of referee.

Biography
Pudas moved to Canada at the age of 18 months. He began his hockey career in Port Arthur, Ontario with the Pascoes, Ports, and later, the Port Arthur Bearcats. On October 28, 1926, Pudas accepted a contract offer from the Toronto St. Pats, along with fellow Bearcats Bill Brydge, Danny Cox and Lorne Chabot. Pudas was recalled December 29, 1926, by the Toronto St. Pats (renamed the Maple Leafs that same season on February 14, 1927) to play four games. These four games made Pudas the first Finnish-born player to play in the NHL.

In 1936, Pudas coached the Port Arthur Bearcats who represented Canada in the Winter Olympics in Garmisch-Partenkirchen in Bavaria, Germany. Canada won a silver medal with Pudas as coach (the only medal Canada won at these games).

Career statistics

Regular season and playoffs

References

External links
 

1899 births
1976 deaths
Canada men's national ice hockey team coaches
Canadian ice hockey forwards
Detroit Olympics (CPHL) players
Emigrants from the Russian Empire to Canada
Finnish emigrants to Canada
Finnish ice hockey players
Hamilton Tigers (CPHL) players
Ice hockey people from Ontario
Ice hockey players at the 1936 Winter Olympics
London Panthers players
Olympic silver medalists for Canada
Sportspeople from Thunder Bay
Stratford Nationals players
Toronto St. Pats players
Windsor Bulldogs (CPHL) players